Richard Norton (died 1523 or 1524) was Archdeacon of Barnstaple during 1508. He had been rector of Ilfracombe from 1492.

References

Archdeacons of Barnstaple
1523 deaths